This is a list of modern Mongol clans.

Khalkha  clans

A
Aduuchin

B
Barga; Barlas, Barulas; Borjigin; Besud; Belej/Balj

D
Daguur (Khitans); Dolood (Dughlats)

H
Hatagin, Hurts (Khurts)

J
Jalair

E
Eljigin

Esud

G
Gorlos

H
Harnut

J
Jalaid (Jalairs)

N
Naiman, Nirun

O
Olkhonud (Olkhunut)

Sh
Saljiud, Sharnud (Sharaid)

T
Taijiud or Taijuud, Tatar, Togoruutan

Ts
Tsoros (Choros people)

Y
Yamaat; Yunsheebuu (Southern Mongols)

Buryat clans

A
Atagan

S
Sunud

B
Bodonguud

Daur clans

D
Daguur; Dular

Hamnigan clans
Altanhan (Mongol); Huuchid (Mongol)

Oirat clans

Bayad clans
The Bayad (Mongol: Баяд/Bayad, lit. "the Riches") is the third largest subgroup of the Mongols in Mongolia and they are a tribe in Four Oirats. Bayads were a prominent clan within the Mongol Empire. Bayads can be found in both Mongolic and Turkic peoples. Within Mongols, the clan is spread through Khalkha, Inner Mongolians, Buryats and Oirats.

Khoton clans
Burut

Myangad clans
Barga; Onhod Ongut

Zakhchin clans
Aatiinkhan; Adsagiinkhan; Baykhiinkhan; Burd Tariachin; Donjooniikhon; Damjaaniikhan; Dumiyenkhen; Emchiinkhen; Khereid; Khotonguud; Khurmshtiinkhan; Mukhlainkhan; Nokhoikhon; 
Shurdaankhan; Tavagzaaniikhan; Tsagaan Yas, Khuu Noyod.

Other Oirat clans

H
Khoid

Southern Mongolian clans

A
Alagui

B
Bayud (Bayads); Burde

M
Manggud (Manghud)

T
Tunggaid (Modern Khereid)

U
Uushin

Mongolian Tuva Tsaatan-Dukha
Urud (Mongol)

Mongolian Tuva clans
Ak irgit; Kizil soyon; (Olot)

Yugur clans

Arlat (Arulad); Kalka (Khalkha Mongols); Oirot (Oirats); Temurchin (Mongol)

Other Mongolic clans

C 

 Chantuu (Mongolized Uzbeks and Uyghurs)

K 

 Khasag, Khasaguud or Khasguud (Mongolized Kazakhs)
 Kalmyks (Kalmyk: Хальмгуд, Xaľmgud, Mongolian: Халимагууд, Halimaguud) There ancestors moved from Dzungaria to Kalmykia in Russia and Kyrgyzstan. They had created the Kalmyk Khanate from 1630 to 1771.

M 

 Moghol people
 Mughal people (Urdu-speaking Mongols)

See also
List of medieval Mongolian tribes and clans
List of Mongol states
List of Mongol rulers
Mongolian name

List of Mongolians

References

Монгол овгийн нэрийн учир, Ж.Сэржээ, УБ, 1999 (in Mongolian); Origin of modern Mongolian clan name, J.Serjee, Ulaanbaatar, 1999

 
Tribes and clans, modern
 
 
Clans